Richard Stone is a British sculptor and painter and a fellow and trustee of the Royal British Society of Sculptors. He was born in 1974 in England and graduated from Central Saint Martins in 2000. In 2014 Stone was awarded the Brian Mercer Residency for Bronze Casting and in 2013 was awarded Arts Council England funding. Stone works between London and Pietrasanta, Italy.

Notable exhibitions
Works by Stone were included in Sweep~Landskip (2018), an exhibition of international artists whose work use landscape as a concept. In 2018, Stone exhibited marble works and a series of abstract paintings at Art Brussels. He was included in the exhibition Nature Morte, which toured museums in Norway, Sweden and Poland before returning to London's Guildhall in 2017. Recent solo exhibitions include everywhen (2017) and gleam (2014).

Critical responses
Stone has been referred to as "one of the most talented emerging artists working in the UK today" and his practice seen as seen as "intrinsic to consider our place and purpose within an ever-changing world". Stone was also included in Michael Petry's Nature Morte which explored the timeless tradition of still life, bought up to date by international contemporary artists including Matt Collishaw, Elmgreen & Dragset, Gabriel Orozco and Gerhard Richter.

Media recognition
Stone has been featured in many media articles including Artdependence, Elephant and Wall Street International Magazine. In 2018, a documentary entitled Hard Beauty screened on Sky Arts in the United Kingdom. The documentary featured Stone discussing his mentor Helaine Blumenfeld's sculptural practice. In 2017, Stone appeared on London Live, where he spoke about the exhibition Nature Morte.

References

1974 births
Living people
Fellows of the Royal British Society of Sculptors
Alumni of Central Saint Martins
21st-century British sculptors
21st-century male artists
20th-century British sculptors
21st-century British painters
British male sculptors
People from Torbay (district)
20th-century British male artists
21st-century British male artists